Qaleh Mahmudi (also Romanized as Qal‘eh Maḩmūdī) is a village in Sofla Rural District, in the Central District of Kharameh County, Fars Province, Iran. At the 2006 census, its population was 54, in 15 families.

References 

Populated places in Kharameh County